Aharpada is a small village in Khandatada Panchayata, Bhadrak district, Orissa, India with a population of nearly 1,000.

People 
Most people in this village are literate and have sound living.
The Bengali community size is large in this village.

Sights 
Some temples of this village are HariHat, Durga Puja committee, Shiva temple.
All of its roads are in good condition. There is some land under cultivation around the village.
Durga puja is celebrated by Bengali community every year.

Nearby villages 
The famous Bhadrakali Temple is in a nearby village called Bhadrakali Sahi. Other nearby villages are Bental and Benipur.

References

External links

Villages in Bhadrak district